The TI-84 Plus is a graphing calculator made by Texas Instruments which was released in early 2004. There is no original TI-84, only the TI-84 Plus, the TI-84 Plus Silver Edition models, and the TI-84 Plus CE. The TI-84 Plus is an enhanced version of the TI-83 Plus. The key-by-key correspondence is relatively the same, but the TI-84 features improved hardware. The archive (ROM) is about 3 times as large, and the CPU is about 2.5 times as fast (over the TI-83 and TI-83 Plus). A USB port and built-in clock functionality were also added. The USB port on the TI-84 Plus series is USB On-The-Go compliant, similar to the next generation TI-Nspire calculator, which supports connecting to USB based data collection devices and probes, and supports device to device transfers over USB rather than over the serial link port.

Versions

TI-84 Plus Silver Edition 
The TI-84 Plus Silver Edition was released in 2004 as an upgrade to the TI-83 Plus. Like the TI-83 Plus Silver Edition, it features a 15 MHz Zilog Z80 processor and 24 kB of user-available RAM. The chip has 128 kB, but Texas Instruments has not made an OS that uses all of it. Newer calculators have a RAM chip that has only 48 kB. All calculators with the letter H or later as the last letter in the serial code have fewer RAM pages, causing some programs to not run correctly. There is 1.5 MB of user-accessible Flash ROM. Like the standard TI-84 Plus, the Silver Edition includes a built-in USB port, a built-in clock, and assembly support. It uses 4 AAA batteries and a backup button cell battery. The TI-84 Plus Silver Edition comes preloaded with a variety of applications. These programs are also available for the TI-84 Plus, but some must be downloaded separately from TI's website. It is manufactured by Kinpo Electronics.

TI offers a special yellow version of the TI-84 Plus, inscribed with the words "School Property", for schools to loan out to students. This special design was produced in an effort to combat theft. Owners can buy other interchangeable colored face-plates and slide-cases online. A kickstand-style slide case and other accessories are also available.

In 2011, TI launched the TI-84 Pocket.fr, a miniaturized version of the TI-84 Plus for the French market.  In 2012, TI launched the TI-84 Plus Pocket SE, a miniaturized version of the TI-84 Plus Silver Edition for the Asian market.

In 2015, Texas Instruments released the TI-84 Plus T in the Netherlands. This model is very similar to the original TI-84 Plus, but features an LED to indicate whether or not the calculator is in Exam Mode. The hardware of the TI-84 Plus T is similar to the TI-84 Plus Silver Edition, with ninety-six 16 kB pages of archive memory, for a total of 1540 kB. However, unlike the TI-84 Plus, the TI-84 Plus T does not allow users to execute assembly programs. The TI-84 Plus T has 2 different Exam Modes available with different levels of restrictiveness. The most restrictive level does not allow for any existing programs to be accessed, and does not allow any new programs to be created. This mode makes the LED blink green. The second, more moderate Exam Mode is the same, apart from three additional applications being allowed (PlySmlt2, Inequalz and Conics). This mode makes the LED blink orange.

TI-84 Plus C Silver Edition 
The TI-84 Plus C Silver Edition was released in 2013 as the first Z80-based Texas Instruments graphing calculator with a color screen. It had a 320x240-pixel full-color screen, a modified version of the TI-84 Plus's 2.55MP operating system, a removable 1200 mAh rechargeable lithium-ion battery, and keystroke compatibility with existing math and programming tools. It had the standard 2.5 mm I/O (DBUS) port and a mini-USB port for connectivity and charging. The calculator was praised for its high-resolution (relative to contemporary graphing calculators) color screen, which allowed new pedagogical approaches such as graphing multiple functions together in different colors. It was widely criticized for its slow performance by educators and hobbyists/hackers alike; the performance was attributed to the calculator retaining its monochrome predecessors' CPU to drive a screen displaying 300 times as much image information. Nonetheless it demonstrated the value of a color-screen TI-84 Plus-family calculator and was superseded two years later by the TI-84 Plus CE which was embraced by the calculator hobbyist community. Notable third-party milestones included overclocking the device from 15 MHz to 22 MHz and the third-party Doors CS shell.

TI-84 Plus CE and TI-84 Plus CE-T 
The TI-84 Plus CE was publicly previewed by TI Education in January 2015 and released in 2015. The calculator retains the 320x240-pixel color screen, rechargeable battery, and key layout of the TI-84 Plus C Silver Edition, while removing the 2.5mm I/O ("DBUS") linkport and moving the USB port and charging LED to the right side of the handheld. The calculator's OS 5.x is incompatible with the TI-84 Plus C Silver Edition's hardware. In addition, the RSA signing key length has been increased to 2048 bits, making infeasible previous efforts to unlock the calculator to unrestricted third-party software development. The calculator has 154KB of user-accessible RAM and 3.0MB of Archive memory. It uses the eZ80 processor from Zilog, making all Z80 assembly programs from the previous TI-84 Plus series calculators incompatible. The CE was introduced in multiple colors (Classic (black), Silver Linings, Radical Red, True Blue, Denim (navy blue), Lightning (light blue), Plum Pi (purple); Positively Pink (as of March 2015), Golden Ratio, and Bright White (as of June 2016) were added later), and further colors have since been released. Like the rest of the TI-84 Plus series, certain countries permit its use in examinations. The calculator comes programmed with seven different languages (English, French, German, Dutch, Portuguese, Spanish, and Swedish).

In 2016, the TI-84 Plus CE-T was released for the European educational market. The only significant difference from the CE model is the addition of an LED that blinks while the calculator is in Press-to-Test mode.

CE calculators revision M and later (manufactured on and after April 2019) contain an improved architecture, with caching with a more recent flash chip (Winbond 25Q32JVSIQ) than on previous revisions, which contained a Winbond W29GL032C. Due to this change, more recent revisions have seen a significant improvement in overall speed. In 2020, TI Education announced its decision to remove support for assembly and C programming on these calculators in response to a video posted on YouTube detailing how to bypass the test mode on OS version 5.2.2. TI's response was widely considered unnecessary, and led to anger from users. The changes are reflected in OS version 5.5.1 for the European models and OS version 5.6 for the US models. Currently, an exploit called ArTIfiCE has been released that allows for native code execution through a bug in the CabriJR app.

TI-84 Plus CE-T Python Edition and TI-84 Plus CE Python 
The TI-84 Plus CE-T Python Edition was released in 2021 and provides OS version 5.6 and above with the ability to program the calculator in Python and includes a preloaded bundle of applications. The Python implementation is extremely slow compared to NumWorks and HP calculators due to the use of an ARM coprocessor running CircuitPython, which communicates to the calculator via 115200 baud UART serial.In the North American market, the TI-84 Plus CE Python replaced the existing TI-84 Plus CE in 2021.

Software
There are three different types of programs which can be downloaded or programmed into the calculators: TI-BASIC, Z80 assembly language, and Flash applications (also written in Z80 assembly). The TI-84 Plus CE is different in that programs are written in TI-BASIC, eZ80 assembly language, or in the C programming language. In addition, there are programs available that are able to compile or interpret other programming languages. The TI-84 Plus CE-T Python Edition supports the Python programming language. Also, there are several languages developed by community members for the calculators, notably ICE, which is for the TI-84 Plus CE, and Axe, which is for the TI-84 Plus and TI-84 Plus SE. There are a wide range of applications that this produces, including science classes, games, calculus, and note taking (when put together with a separately sold keyboard).

The TI-84 Plus series is exactly like its predecessor in that it can be used on the SAT and ACT examinations as well as International Baccalaureate examinations. However, in some cases those administering the exam may reset the calculator's memory beforehand to prevent cheating through the use of built-in programs or other data.

When OS 2.30 was initially released, users noticed the speed of graphing was greatly reduced. The explanation was that the update added asymptote checking in graphing.

In January 2006, Texas Instruments released v2.40 of the operating system for the TI-84 Plus series. The most noticeable addition to the new OS was the "Press-To-Test" feature that allowed a teacher to disable any programs installed on the calculator, so they cannot be used on tests, etc.

As of OS version 2.53MP which was released in February 2010, support was added for prettyprinted expressions. However, some programs stopped working correctly in this OS version, or were running slower. The current OS version is 2.55MP, which was released in January 2011.

In July 2009, a community-made patch was released which allowed user-made operating systems to be easily uploaded onto the TI-84 Plus series. Shortly after the patch was developed, the RSA keys for the calculator's operating system were factored via the General number field sieve (GNFS) algorithm, making a software patch unnecessary. In response to this, Texas Instruments released a newer hardware revision which only accepts other, stronger RSA keys, making it harder to load user-made operating systems or older TI operating systems (2.53MP and earlier). The community has found a way around the newest limitation by discovering a way to revert to older versions of the boot code.

The TI-84 Plus CE-T Python Edition supports using CircuitPython, a Python 3 variant, developed by Adafruit. Only the math and random modules are initially supported, but it is possible that wider support will become available either from TI or from the community.

Critics point out that the basic design of the TI-84 has not changed since it was released in 2004, contrary to the trend of rapid design change occurring in other areas of electronics manufacturing.

Technical specifications
CPU: Zilog Z80 15 MHz, with a 6 MHz compatibility mode.
Flash ROM:
Plus Edition: 480 KB user-accessible out of 1 MB total
Silver Edition: 1.5 MB user-accessible out of 2 MB total
Third-party software permits usage of FAT16-formatted USB drives
RAM: 24 KB user-accessible out of 128 KB total (48 KB on newer models)
Display:
Text: -16-×|8| characters (normal font)
Graphics:
Plus Edition: 96 (0-95) × 64 (0-63) pixels, monochrome (software grayscale can be used) LCD
Plus C/CE: 320 × 240-pixel screen, 140 DPI, 16-bit color. Drawing pixel range: 0-164 x 0-264.
I/O:
Link port, 9.6 kbit/s
50-button built-in keypad
USB
Power:
Silver Edition: 4 AAA batteries plus 1 SR44SW or 303 silver oxide battery for backup
C Silver Edition and CE: Rechargeable lithium-ion battery
Integrated programming languages: TI-BASIC and machine code. Assembly requires a computer with a Z80 assembler or an on-calc assembler.

Programming

The TI-84 Plus is based heavily on its predecessor, the TI-83 Plus. As with all other calculators in the series, the TI-84 Plus supports native Z80 assembly as well as TI's interpreted, BASIC-like language for calculators, dubbed TI-BASIC. Programming for the TI-84 Plus is nearly identical to programming for the TI-83 Plus, with a few new functions in both TI-BASIC and the calculator's assembly support that do not exist on earlier models and OS versions. Several attempts have been made at creating a C to Zilog Z80 assembly assembler, such as SDCC.

The TI-84 Plus CE series can be programmed in TI-BASIC, eZ80 assembly, or with the C programming language. To aid in programming, a USB keyboard can be attached to the TI-84 Plus CE via a USB On-The-Go adapter.

In 2021, the TI-84 Plus CE Python Edition was released, which supports native Python programming via an ARM coprocessor.

The TI-84 Plus series calculators' dialect of TI-BASIC is the same as that of the TI-83 Plus series, but with a few more commands including ones for date and time.

On May 20, 2020, Texas Instruments revealed that support of assembly and C applications and programming would be removed in OS version 5.5.1 and 5.6 for the TI-84 Plus CE and TI-83 Premium CE. 4 months later, a jailbreak called arTIfiCE, which exploits the application Cabri Jr. to run arbitrary code, was written that restored compatibility.

See also
 Texas Instruments
 Comparison of Texas Instruments graphing calculators
 Cemetech
 TI-BASIC

References

External links

TI Education Portal
ticalc.org The flagship hobbyist program- and game-hosting archives

Graphing calculators
TI-84
Products introduced in 2004
Z80